Alejandro Alberto De Aza Ceda (born April 11, 1984) is a Dominican professional baseball outfielder for the Long Island Ducks of the Atlantic League of Professional Baseball. He has played in Major League Baseball (MLB) for the Florida Marlins, Chicago White Sox, Baltimore Orioles, Boston Red Sox, San Francisco Giants, New York Mets, and Washington Nationals.

In 2013, De Aza played for the eventual 2013 World Baseball Classic-winning team from the Dominican Republic, having a .208 batting average and 3 RBI in 8 games as a center fielder, going 1 for 3 in the final game against Puerto Rico.

Professional career

Los Angeles Dodgers
De Aza was originally signed by the Los Angeles Dodgers as a non-drafted free agent on May 1, .

Florida Marlins
In , De Aza batted .286 with 34 stolen bases and 75 runs scored while playing for the Jupiter Hammerheads of the Class A-Advanced Florida State League. In , De Aza batted .278 with 12 doubles, two triples, two home runs, 16 RBI and 27 stolen bases at Double-A.

On March 28, De Aza was named the starting center fielder for the Marlins, beating out Reggie Abercrombie, Eric Reed, and Alex Sánchez in what was seen as a surprise. In 2007, he batted .303 (10-for-33) in nine games for the Marlins before going on the disabled list on April 16 with a right ankle sprain; an MRI in mid-May revealed that his ankle had a hairline fracture. The fractured ankle required surgery and De Aza was placed on the disabled list for the 2007 season.  De Aza was called up by the Florida Marlins in May 2009.

Chicago White Sox

On October 21, 2009, the Chicago White Sox claimed De Aza off waivers from the Marlins.
On July 27, 2011, he hit the first home run of his MLB career, off Detroit Tigers pitcher Max Scherzer.

On January 18, 2013, De Aza signed a one-year, $2.075 million deal to avoid arbitration with the White Sox. De Aza was the starting center fielder once again, and his main backups were Jordan Danks and DeWayne Wise. He would also periodically fill in at left field when Dayán Viciedo would be injured. In 153 games, he hit .264/.323/.405 with 17 home runs, 62 RBI and 20 stolen bases.

On March 31, 2014, De Aza recorded his first career multi-home run game in an Opening Day win over the Minnesota Twins.

Baltimore Orioles

On August 30, 2014, De Aza was traded from the Chicago White Sox to the Baltimore Orioles for minor league pitchers Miguel Chalas and Mark Blackmar.  In his first five games with the Orioles, De Aza hit two home runs, had three RBI, stole a base, scored four runs and batted .400. He was designated for assignment on May 27, 2015.

Boston Red Sox
On June 3, 2015, De Aza was traded to the Boston Red Sox for cash considerations and prospect Joe Gunkel.

San Francisco Giants
On August 31, 2015, De Aza was traded to the San Francisco Giants with cash considerations for minor league pitcher Luis Ysla.

New York Mets

On December 23, 2015, De Aza signed a 1-year, $5.75 million contract with the New York Mets.

In 2016 he batted a career-low .205 in 130 games, and had a .297 on-base percentage, which was his lowest since his rookie season of 2007, and his .321 slugging percentage was his lowest since 2009. His average of a strikeout per every 3.99 plate appearances was the worst of his career. He did not have an assist in 76 games in the outfield, which were third most among NL outfielders without any assists.

Oakland Athletics
On January 20, 2017, De Aza signed a minor league contract with the Oakland Athletics. He opted out of the contract near the end of spring training and became a free agent.

Washington Nationals
On June 14, 2017, De Aza signed a minor league deal with the Washington Nationals. De Aza appeared in his first game for the Nationals on August 16. He re-signed with the Nationals on another minor league contract on March 2, 2018, and was released on March 24. He was re-signed on March 26, 2018, to the same terms of his original minor league deal. De Aza was later released from the organization on August 8, 2018.

New Britain Bees
On April 16, 2019, De Aza signed with the New Britain Bees of the Atlantic League of Professional Baseball.

Minnesota Twins
On July 17, 2019, De Aza had his contract purchased by the Minnesota Twins. He became a free agent following the 2019 season.

Lancaster Barnstormers
On November 5, 2019, De Aza re-signed with the New Britain Bees of the Atlantic League of Professional Baseball. However, following the Bees' move to the Futures Collegiate Baseball League, he was drafted by the Lancaster Barnstormers in the Bees dispersal draft. De Aza did not play in a game in 2020 due to the cancellation of the ALPB season because of the COVID-19 pandemic. On June 5, 2021, De Aza re-signed with the Barnstormers. He became a free agent following the season.

Long Island Ducks
On May 10, 2022, De Aza signed with the Long Island Ducks of the Atlantic League of Professional Baseball. In 109 games he slashed .343/.452/.516 with 10 home runs and 68 RBIs.

References

External links

1984 births
Living people
Azucareros del Este players
Baltimore Orioles players
Boston Red Sox players
Cardenales de Lara players
Carolina Mudcats players
Charlotte Knights players
Chicago White Sox players
Columbus Catfish players
Dominican Republic expatriate baseball players in the United States
Estrellas Orientales players
Florida Marlins players
Gulf Coast Dodgers players
Gulf Coast Marlins players
Jupiter Hammerheads players
Lancaster Barnstormers players
Major League Baseball center fielders
Major League Baseball left fielders
Major League Baseball players from the Dominican Republic
New Britain Bees players
New Orleans Zephyrs players
New York Mets players
Ogden Raptors players
People from Guaymate
Rochester Red Wings players
San Francisco Giants players
Syracuse Chiefs players
Toros del Este players
Washington Nationals players
World Baseball Classic players of the Dominican Republic
2013 World Baseball Classic players
Sultanes de Monterrey players
Águilas de Mexicali players
Dominican Republic expatriate baseball players in Venezuela